Willy Gustav Erich Jaeckel (10 February 1888, Breslau – 30 January 1944, Berlin) was a German Expressionist painter and lithographer.

Biography 
Jaeckel's father was a public lands manager and he originally intended to become a forest ranger, but poor health forced him to change his plans. From 1906 to 1908, he studied at the art school in Breslau, then enrolled at the Dresden Academy of Fine Arts, under the direction of Otto Gussmann, an ornamental painter. In 1913, he moved to Berlin to work as a free-lance artist and became a member of the Berlin Secession in 1915. Four years later, he was elected a member of the Prussian Academy of Arts and became a teacher at the University of the Arts in 1925.

His first successful painting was "Kampf" (Battle, or Struggle), a large canvas featuring a bellowing, muscular, naked man. In 1928, he was awarded the "Georg-Schlicht-Preis" for the "most beautiful portrait of a German woman". His work was part of the art competitions at the 1928 Summer Olympics and the 1932 Summer Olympics.

He was named an Associate Professor in 1933, but he was dismissed when the Nazis came to power. His students protested, and he was eventually reinstated. This victory was short-lived, however. Those who took classes with him were likely not to graduate and, in 1937, some of his works were officially classified as "degenerate". In response, he painted "Plowman in the Evening" (1939), meant to depict the Nazi concept of Blood and Soil. Many of his works survived the war only because the Nazi government removed them from Berlin.

He lost his studio to a bombing raid in 1943 and he was killed during another raid early the following year. One of his major works, a four-part fresco mural at the Bahlsen bakery in Hanover dating from 1917, was destroyed later in 1944.

Selected paintings

References

Further reading
 Dagmar Klein, Der Expressionist Willy Jaeckel, Müller Botermann, 1990 
 Willy Jaeckel 1888-1944. So war mein Denken, (exhibition catalog, Miesbach, Klinger, 2000, 
 Margrit Bröhan et al., Willy Jaeckel : (1888 - 1944) ; Gemälde, Pastelle, Aquarelle, (exhibition catalog for "Mythos und Mondäne - Bilder von Willy Jaeckel"), Bröhan Museum,  Taschenbuch, 2003

External links 

 Arcadja Auctions: More works by Jaeckel.
 Drawings by Willy Jaeckel @ LACMA
 
 Willy Jaeckel @ the Hiddensee website
 Article on Jaeckel from Oberallgäu-Kultur, 20 March 2010

1888 births
1944 deaths
20th-century German painters
20th-century German male artists
German male painters
German Expressionist painters
German portrait painters
Artists from Wrocław
Olympic competitors in art competitions
German civilians killed in World War II
Deaths by airstrike during World War II